Bashkim Ajdini (born 10 December 1992), previously known as Bashkim Renneke is a Kosovan professional footballer who plays as a right-back for German club SV Sandhausen.

Club career

VfL Osnabrück
On 24 May 2016, Ajdini joined 3. Liga side VfL Osnabrück. On 31 July 2016, he made his debut in a 0–1 away win against Preußen Münster after coming on as a substitute at 58th minute in place of Jules Reimerink. Twenty-six days after debut, Ajdini scored his first goal for VfL Osnabrück in his second appearance for the club in a 4–2 away defeat over Werder Bremen II in 3. Liga.

SV Sandhausen
On 28 June 2021, Ajdini joined 2. Bundesliga side SV Sandhausen, to replace the injured Dennis Diekmeier as the second choice. On 25 July 2021, he made his debut in a 0–2 home defeat against Fortuna Düsseldorf after being named in the starting line-up.

International career
Ajdini was eligible for Kosovo and Germany internationally, as well as Sweden, his birthplace. On 25 May 2021, he received a call-up from Kosovo for the friendly matches against San Marino and Malta, he was an unused substitute in these matches.

Personal life
Ajdini was born in Halmstad, Sweden, where his parents had emigrated to escape the tensions of the Yugoslav Wars, and later settled in Schloß Holte-Stukenbrock, Germany. His family was deported back to Veliki Trnovac in August 2003, but he returned to Germany a year later after being adopted by a German family living in Hövelhof and taking their surname Renneke instead of his original surname Ajdini. On 5 March 2019, he re-took his birth surname "Ajdini".

References

External links

Living people
1992 births
Sportspeople from Halmstad
Association football fullbacks
Kosovan men's footballers
Kosovo international footballers
Kosovan expatriate footballers
Kosovan expatriate sportspeople in Germany
Swedish men's footballers
Swedish expatriate footballers
Swedish expatriate sportspeople in Germany
Swedish people of Kosovan descent
Swedish people of Albanian descent
German footballers
German people of Kosovan descent
German people of Albanian descent
3. Liga players
2. Bundesliga players
Arminia Bielefeld players
SG Sonnenhof Großaspach players
VfL Osnabrück players
SV Sandhausen players
Sportspeople from Halland County